The Nissan Shield was a one day cricket tournament in South Africa. This was a knockout competition based on the English Gillette Cup.

The first one was played in the 1969-70 season and was won by an Eddie Barlow XI representing Western Province. The tournament was known as :

 Gillette Cup      1969/70 - 1976/77
 Datsun Shield     1977/78 - 1982/83
 Nissan Shield     1983/84 - 1991/92
 Total Power Series          1992-93

Format
The competition was a 60-over per side knockout tournament. It featured section A and B Currie Cup teams competing in the first round of eight, with the winners going through to the semi-finals, with a final at the Wanderers Stadium, Johannesburg.

A South Africa African XI composed of Black African players competed in 1975-76 and 1976-77. This inexperienced team lost their two games by over 200 runs with Alan Barrow scoring 202 not out for Natal in 1975.

For the 1980-81 season semi-final matches were the best of three. In 1981-82 the matches were 55 overs per side. For 1986-87 and 1987-88 there were two groups of four teams with the top two teams going through to the semi-finals. From the 1989-90 season minor teams and country teams were admitted to make a first round of 16 teams.

In the 1990-91 season substitutes were permitted with 14 players named and 6 substitutes allowed. This was introduced to "encourage inventiveness and enterprise"  The following season, 1991–92, the competition reverted to 11 per side as South Africa had been re-admitted to the ICC. The final season's, 1992–93, matches were 50 overs per side. The Benson and Hedges Series, now known as the MTN Domestic Championship, is South Africa's domestic one-day tournament.

Transvaal was the most successful team. Their "Mean Machine" side, mainly led by Clive Rice, won the competition seven times in eight years between 1979 and 1986.

Winners
Gillette Cup

 1969-70 Eddie Barlow XI (Western Province) 
 1970-71 Western Province
 1971-72 Eastern Province
 1972-73 Western Province
 1973-74 Transvaal
 1974-75 Natal
 1975-76 Eastern Province
 1976-77 Natal

Datsun Shield

 1977-78 Rhodesia
 1978-79 Transvaal
 1979-80 Transvaal
 1980-81 Transvaal
 1981-82 Western Province
 1982-83 Transvaal

Nissan Shield

 1983-84 Transvaal
 1984-85 Transvaal
 1985-86 Transvaal
 1986-87 Natal
 1987-88 Eastern Province
 1988-89 Western Province
 1989-90 Eastern Province
 1990-91 Transvaal
 1991-92 Orange Free State

Total Power Series

 1992-93 Orange Free State

Transvaal won 9 times, Western Province and Eastern Province 4 each, Natal 3, Orange Free State 2, Rhodesia and Eddie Barlow XI 1 each.

References

External links
 Cricket Archive

South African domestic cricket competitions